Bosmansdam High School (Afrikaans: Hoërskool Bosmansdam) is a public English & Afrikaans medium co-educational high school. It was founded in 1971 in Bothasig, a suburb of Cape Town. The school is state assisted and therefore, like most other schools in South Africa, it charges a set amount of money for its services. The school offers a wide variety of sporting and cultural activities in addition to its academic program.

History
Bothasig and Bosmansdam High School are located on what was originally the farm, Bosmansdam. Part of the land was taken over by the Milnerton Municipality between 1961 and 1989. Bosmansdam was renamed Bothasig ("Botha's Vision") after the then Minister of Housing (and later State President), Mr. P.W. Botha, presented a house to the first resident.

The town grew rapidly and it soon became clear that there was a need for a high school. The first staff consisted of only seven members. The first school committee was elected on 17 March 1971 under chairmanship of Mr. M.J. v.N. van Schoor. Initially the school motto was UNITAS but changed to UNITATE FORTIOR (stronger through unity). The school colours were also different at first with blue, orange and white making way in 1982 for blue, red and gold. The official emblem and tie were adopted in 1989.

The school song was composed by the well-known Dirkie de Villiers with lyrics by his wife Doll.

1980 saw the first appearance of VOX (voice), the school paper.

Academics
Bosmansdam currently offers a wide variety of subjects to its students. Bosmansdam is a dual-medium school which makes English and Afrikaans the languages of instruction. This also means that the subjects of English and Afrikaans (one to be taken as Home Language and the other as First Additional Language) is compulsory. Unfortunately this means learners who cannot understand instruction in these languages and/or are unable to take one of these subjects cannot be accommodated. Immigrants may apply for exemption from Afrikaans. In this case another subject should be taken as extra subject in the place of Afrikaans.

Juniors:
At Grade 8 and 9 level all the required learning areas are covered. This includes:
 English (Home and Additional Language)
 Afrikaans (Home and Additional Language)
 Mathematics
 Natural Science
 Economic Management Sciences (EMS),
 Human and Social Sciences (History and Geography)
 Arts and Culture
 Technology
 Life Orientation

The subject of Design is also offered to Grade 8's and 9's in which computer and internet skills are taught with a focus on Google Apps and its many uses.

Seniors:
From Grade 10 to 12, students are provided with a wide variety of subject choices. English (Home or Additional Language), Afrikaans (Home or Additional Language) and Life Orientation are compulsory subjects. Students may then choose between Mathematics and Mathematical Literacy. The remaining subjects are divided into three groups. Students must choose one subject from each group. The exact structure of these groups differ from year to year to match student demand, but the following subjects are offered: 
 Accounting
 Tourism
 Life Sciences (Biology)
 Business Studies
 Physical Science
 Computer Applications Studies (CAT)
 Economics
 History
 Consumer Studies

Some of these subjects can also be taken as extra subjects.

Bosmansdam has in the recent past been able boast a Matric Pass rate of between 97% and 100% with overall results comparable to neighbouring schools. In 2011 Bosmansdam achieved a 100% matric pass rate with a very high percentage of students qualifying for admission to bachelor's degree study and the school followed this up with a 99.23% pass rate in 2012. The 100% target was once again achieved in 2013. Bosmansdam achieved a 98% matric pass rate in 2014 despite this being the first year in which it was possible for a learner to be progressed to Grade 12 without passing Grade 11. In 2015, the school once again achieved a 98.63% matric pass rate. Bosmansdam's results therefore comfortably surpassed that of many of its neighbours. A highly qualified and motivated staff is largely to thank for this.

Sport
Bosmansdam offers a variety of sports to its students.

Summer sports offered:
Girls 
Tennis,
Softball,
Athletics, Action Netball, Action Hockey

Boys
Tennis,
Cricket,
Athletics, Touch rugby, Action Soccer

Winter sports offered:
Girls
Netball,
Field Hockey

Boys
Rugby

Chess is also a very successful sport at Bosmansdam. Former student, Clarke Tieties attained Western Province colours in 2010 with Shane Klaase and Joshua Raynard following suit in 2015.

As a smaller school, Bosmansdam struggles to compete against the larger and wealthier schools in the Western Cape but within its various leagues, the school is very competitive. The school has achieved some success on the rugby field. The 1st XV competes successfully against the likes of President High School, Table View High School, The Settlers High School and J.G. Meiring High School. 2011 saw the 1st XV losing only one league game against a very strong side from President High School. Bosmansdam however beat President in 2012, which was another highly successful season. The 2012 side also managed a draw against Interschools rivals, Labori, in Paarl. This was the best Interschools result away from home ever. 2013 and 2014 had some mixed results although the win ratio was well above 70%. 2015 and 2016 have been average seasons, but a promising group of junior players augers well for the future. The u/19B team also went unbeaten in 2014 – a testament to the depth of rugby talent at Bosmansdam. 2015 also saw the launch of the Knights concept at Bosmansdam. This resulted in the 1st XV being renamed the "REMAX Knights" thanks to a generous new sponsorship.

Bosmansdam's Netball girls are also always competitive with senior teams often ending in the top 3 in their zone over recent years. A number of players have achieved Western Province and even Western Cape colours. The 2016 team contains three Western Province and two Western Cape players – a fantastic achievement. Other girls have also received Western Province colours for Action Netball. Netball has been the most successful sport for Bosmansdam at Interschools in recent years. 2017 will see the launch of the "Bosmansdam Netball Academy" where talented players will be drafted into the 1st team training squad regardless of their age group in order to better develop their skills. The academy will be led by Mrs. Tanja Vermeulen, who is herself a former provincial Netball player.

Hockey is a relatively new sport at Bosmansdam but player numbers are growing rapidly and results are slowly improving as the school establishes itself. Hockey is however currently only offered for girls due to a lack of demand among the boys.

The well-known nearby Bothasig Baseball Club and the results of Bosmansdam's Softball sides seem to indicate a natural aptitude for the sport in the Bothasig area! The girls Softball sides have been going since 2011 and met with immediate success. A number of girls have been selected for the Western Province Northern Zone team. Former Bosmansdam student and former South African Baseball player (and now a teacher at the school), J.P. Norman, has taken on the coaching role.

Soccer is however not offered due to a lack of facilities and coaches. Priority is afforded to the traditional sports of the school. Learners are allowed to join the nearby Bothasig Soccer Club as long as it does not interfere with school commitments. The highly successful club's senior teams contain many Bosmansdam students.

Interschools
As with most schools in South Africa, the culmination of the sporting year is the highly anticipated event known as Interschools. The entire event spans a week in which the school competes against Labori High School (based in Paarl) in a variety of sports and cultural pursuits. 2016 is the 16th year that Bosmansdam and Labori have been interschool rivals. Debating and chess matches take place during the week. On the Saturday, the other winter sports are decided. Initially the much older Labori with its boarding facilities dominated Interschools with a number of years seeing serious losses on Bosmansdam's side. The tide does appear to be turning as scores are becoming closer and closer. Especially on the netball courts Bosmansdam has been dominating in recent years. Interschools is traditionally decided by the winner of the 1st XV rugby match and on this count Labori have won 10 times and Bosmansdam 4 with one draw. 2011 saw Labori beating Bosmansdam by 1 point in the final seconds. In 2012 however Bosmansdam managed to secure a 17–17 draw in Paarl in shocking weather conditions against a supposedly much stronger side. This was Bosmansdam's best Interschools result away from home ever. Bosmansdam came close again in 2013, but were unable to convert pressure into points and eventually lost. 2014 saw Labori go unbeaten in their most successful season ever and Bosmansdam were rank underdogs. The Bossies showed spirit however and were in the game until the very end before Labori's much vaunted "dream team" finally put them away. 2015 saw the Labori "dream team" reach maturity and the result was one that Bosmansdam would like to forget. 2016 should be much closer though as Bosmansdam has steadily improved over the past 16 years and the one-sided Interschools of the past seem to be over

Apart from Interschools, Bosmansdam also has many other derby days. These include derbies against President High School and close neighbours and fierce rivals, Edgemead High School. The rivalry against Edgemead is especially intense thanks to the close proximity as well as the connection between the two communities. The two schools are also rivals for admissions and good sports results are vital. Having Interschools contested between the two neighbouring schools could be considered in the future as it would make very good sense. This will however not be done at the expense of the good relationship with Labori.

Technology
Bosmansdam has in recent years shifted its focus to the extensive use of technology. This focus is not only with the intention of improving the quality of education for its learners, but also to properly prepare them for the modern work environment. Bosmansdam is an accredited Google Apps for Education school. School fees and donations have been well used in recent years to improve the technology on offer in the school. All teachers now have Chrome Books (Google-based laptops), data projectors and Wi-Fi internet access at their disposal. The administration of the school is also slowly but surely becoming cloud-based as the school attempts to embrace an eco-friendly culture. Regular training sessions are offered to the teachers to enable them to make full use of the benefits that Google Apps for education holds. All learners are given their own e-mail addresses and are able to communicate with the teachers and also gain access to cloud-based notes and other resources by means of Google Classrooms. Learners also have access to three computer labs which enables them to do research and complete tasks. Bosmansdam has managed to establish itself as leader in the field of technology among public schools in its area.

Admission
Bosmansdam High School is situated in Bothasig which is part of the urban sprawl of the Northern Suburbs of Cape Town. This means that students are no longer drawn solely from the surrounding community. All schools have been allocated "feeder areas". These are the areas the school is supposed to serve. Any applicants from within this area must be admitted to the school regardless of their ability to pay school fees. As with most schools, Bosmansdam struggles with a large number of parents who do not or cannot pay school fees. Another problem faced is that many residents of the feeder area have in recent years sent their children to neighbouring schools. This forces the school to admit children from outside the feeder area.

There is now a renewed focus to entrench Bosmansdam's role as an integral part of Bothasig and its community. Although not a policy of the school, it is clear that the school is in a rivalry with neighbours such as Edgemead High School and Tygerberg High School. The school has in recent years achieved academic results comparable with these schools and in some cases have surpassed them.

Recent demographic trends have placed Bosmansdam in a rather unusual situation. Recent history has seen the numbers of Afrikaans speaking learners in areas such as Table View (including Parklands and other areas), Milnerton and even Bothasig slowly decline. This has led to Afrikaans medium classes being ceased at both Table View High School and J.G. Meiring High School. Even President High School has been forced to become dual medium. Bosmansdam is now the only high school that offers Afrikaans medium classes in the Milnerton – Table View – Bothasig area (including Edgemead, Richwood and all areas in between). According to legislation regarding feeder areas, this makes all Afrikaans speaking students in these areas a priority for admittance to Bosmansdam. This could result in significant savings to parents in these areas that have to pay for transport to far-away schools such as Jan van Riebeeck High School and Durbanville High School.

Thanks to sound financial management, Bosmansdam also charges some of the lowest school fees in the area.

Notable alumni
 Alderman The Honourable James Vos, Member of Parliament for the Democratic Alliance and Shadow Minister for Tourism
 Lee Gallacher (Lee Dean) Inspirational Speaker & Round the World Yachtsman. BT Global Challenge 00/01 & Admirals Cup 2003 

 Jody Williams. Winner of the fourth season of South African Idols in 2007.

References
"About". Bosmansdam High School.

External links
Official Website

Educational institutions established in 1971
High schools in South Africa
Schools in Cape Town
1971 establishments in South Africa
Bilingual schools in South Africa